Mississauga First Nation, also spelt Mississaugi, is one of the six First Nations that make up the Mississauga Nations.  It is located directly west of Blind River, Ontario, Canada, on the Mississagi River 8 Reserve.

Name 
The word Mississauga is an anglicized version of the Ojibwe word Misswezaagiing, which means ‘a river with many outlets.’ This name comes from the Mississagi River, which is a bird-foot delta, a haven for fish and waterfowl and is currently a jointly managed Provincial Park.

The people of Mississaugi have resided there since time immemorial.

Notable members 
 Cecil Youngfox (1942–1987), artist

References

External links

The Smoke Signal, Mississaugi First Nation News
"Mississisauga", Indian and Northern Affairs Canada

 
First Nations governments in Ontario
Geography of Algoma District